Danse des Ouléd-Naïd is a 1902 French short silent film directed by Segundo de Chomón.

The film depicts a female Algerian dancer.

See also 
 List of French films before 1910

External links 
 

1902 films
French short films
French silent short films
Films directed by Segundo de Chomón
Articles containing video clips
1900s dance films
1900s French films